Bánh lá (/bǎɲ lǎ/), literally meaning "leaf cake", is a category of bánh, or Vietnamese cakes, that consist of a parcel of a variety of rice stuffed with some fillings and wrapped in a leaf or leaves.

Varieties
Bánh bột lọc – cassava cake packed with shrimp
Bánh chưng
Bánh dừa – glutinous rice mixed with black bean paste cooked in coconut juice, wrapped in coconut leaf. The filling can be mung bean stir-fried in coconut juice or banana.
Bánh gai – made from the leaves of the gai tree (Boehmeria nivea) dried, boiled, ground into small pieces, then mixed with glutinous rice, wrapped in banana leaf. The filling is made from a mixture of coconut, mung bean, peanuts, winter melon, sesames, and lotus seeds.
Bánh giầy – white, flat, round glutinous rice cake with tough, chewy texture filled with mung bean or served with Vietnamese sausage (giò lụa)
Bánh giò – pyramid-shaped rice dough dumplings filled with pork, shallot, and wood ear mushroom wrapped in banana leaf
Bánh ít
Bánh ít lá gai – triangular dumpling wrapped in ramie leaf, similar to Chinese zongzi
Bánh ít tro – used in the Dragon Boat Festival (Vietnamese: Tết Đoan Ngọ).
Bánh khoái
Bánh nậm – flat rice-flour dumpling from Hue, wrapped in a banana leaf
Bánh nếp
Bánh phu thê – literally "husband and wife cake"; a sweet cake made of rice or tapioca flour and gelatin, filled with mung bean paste; also spelled bánh xu xê)
Bánh tẻ
Bánh tét
Bánh tro and bánh ú used in the Dragon Boat Festival (Vietnamese: Tết Đoan Ngọ).

References

Vietnamese pastries
Vietnamese rice dishes
Dumplings
Stuffed dishes